JLR may refer to

Places
 Jabalpur Airport (IATA airport code: JLR, ICAO airport code: VAJB), in India
 Jetalsar railway station (rail code: JLR), in India

Publications
 Journal of Language Relationship
 Journal of Law and Religion 
 Journal of Lipid Research
 University of Michigan Journal of Law Reform

Companies
 Jaguar Land Rover, a British automobile-manufacturer